The 1976 Italian Open was a combined men's and women's tennis tournament that was played by men on outdoor clay courts at the Foro Italico in Rome, Italy. The men's tournament was part of the 1976 Commercial Union Assurance Grand Prix while the women's tournament was part of the 1976 Virginia Slims World Championship Series. The tournament was held from 23 May until 30 May 1976. The singles titles were won by Third-seeded Adriano Panatta and Mima Jaušovec. In his first-round match Panatta survived 11 match points against Kim Warwick.

Prize money

Source: World of Tennis 1977

Finals

Men's singles
 Adriano Panatta defeated  Guillermo Vilas 2–6, 7–6, 6–2, 7–6

Women's singles
 Mima Jaušovec defeated  Lesley Hunt 6–1, 6–3

Men's doubles
 Brian Gottfried /  Raúl Ramírez defeated  Geoff Masters /  John Newcombe 7–6, 5–7, 6–3, 3–6, 6–3

Women's doubles
 Linky Boshoff /  Ilana Kloss defeated  Virginia Ruzici /  Mariana Simionescu 6–1, 6–2

Notes

References

External links
WTA – Women's Draw Singles 
WTA – Women's Draw Doubles 
ITF – Tournament details

Italian Open
Italian Open (tennis)
Italian Open
1976 in Italian tennis